English recording artist Cheryl (formerly a member of English pop group Girls Aloud), has recorded songs for four solo studio albums and one extended play (EP), some of which were collaborations with other recording artists. She first appeared as a solo artist on will.i.am's song "Heartbreaker", released on 5 May 2008, providing backing vocals during the chorus.

Her debut studio album, entitled 3 Words, was released in October 2009. "Fight for This Love" was released as the lead single; it is a hybrid of genres, combining pop, dance and R&B. It was co-written by Andre Merritt, Steve Kipner and Wayne Wilkins. American songwriter Priscilla Renea penned the track "Happy Hour", which compares a relationship to an alcohol addiction. Fraser T Smith and Taio Cruz collaborated on the song "Stand Up". will.i.am co-wrote four tracks with Cheryl, and appears as a featured artist on three of them: the second single release title track, "Heaven" and "Boy Like You". The third and final single to be released from the album was "Parachute", a pop love song written by Ingrid Michaelson and Marshall Altman. On 18 April 2010, Cole released a three track EP entitled 3 Words – The B-Sides EP.

Cheryl released her second album called Messy Little Raindrops in October 2010. The lead single, "Promise This", is an upbeat pop song which is more influenced by dance music compared to her previous material. "The Flood" served as the album's second and final single. The soft rock song was written by Renea and Wilkins. Cole reunited with will.i.am and they wrote two tracks together, "Live Tonight" and "Let's Get Down", and appears as a featured artist on the latter. J.R. Rotem produced the track "Better to Lie", which features August Rigo, while Travie McCoy co-wrote and appears as a guest artist on the song "Yeah Yeah". American singer-songwriter Kelis co-wrote the track "Waiting". Cheryl provided background vocals for will.i.am and Nicki Minaj's track "Check It Out" (Special Mix), and it was released on 29 October 2010.

Cheryl released her third album in June 2012 called A Million Lights. It was preceded by the lead single called "Call My Name", a dance-pop song which was written and produced solely by Calvin Harris. The second single, "Under the Sun", was co-written by Cheryl with Alex da Kid, Carlos Battey, Jayson DeZuzio, Mike Del Rio and Steven Battey. Cheryl and will.i.am collaborated on one song for the album, "Craziest Things", on which he is a guest vocalist. Wretch 32 co-wrote the song "Screw You" and is a featured artist, while Lana Del Rey co-wrote the song "Ghetto Baby". Cruz also contributed to the album, co-writing "Mechanics of the Heart", while Dada Life wrote and produced "Love Killer".

Cheryl released her fourth album in November 2014 called Only Human. It was preceded by the lead single called "Crazy Stupid Love featuring Tinie Tempah". The song debuted at number one on the UK Singles Chart, selling 118,000 copies in its first week, becoming Cole's fourth number one single. The album's second single, "I Don't Care", was released before the album on 31 October 2014 and became Cheryl's fifth number one making chart history as she is the first ever British female solo artist to have five number ones in the UK. Only Human entered the UK Albums Chart at number seven.

Songs

References

Cole, Cheryl